Ronald Kyle Bird (born April 12, 1993) is an American professional baseball relief pitcher who is a free agent. He has played in Major League Baseball (MLB) for the Texas Rangers and in Nippon Professional Baseball (NPB) for the Hiroshima Toyo Carp.

Amateur career
Bird attended Clay High School in Green Cove Springs, Florida. Undrafted out of high school in 2011, Bird attended Florida State University for two years (2012 and 2013), before transferring to Division II Flagler College in St. Augustine, Florida, for his junior season in 2014. He was drafted by the Tampa Bay Rays in the 35th round, 1,057th overall, of the 2014 MLB draft.

Professional career

Tampa Bay Rays
After signing with Tampa Bay, Bird was assigned to the rookie Princeton Rays to make his professional debut in 2014. In 19 innings pitched, he posted a 1–0 record with a 4.19 earned run average (ERA). He split the 2015 season between the Class A Bowling Green Hot Rods and the Triple-A Durham Bulls. Through 33 games (1 with Durham), he accumulated 4–0 record with a 2.54 ERA and 71 strikeouts in 70.1 innings. He played the 2016 season with both the Class A-Advanced Charlotte Stone Crabs and the Double-A Montgomery Biscuits. He appeared in 68 innings across 43 games, earning a 3–2 record with a 2.28 ERA and 60 strikeouts. He split the 2017 season between Montgomery and Durham. In 54 games, he posted a 4–2 record with a 2.89 ERA and 70 strikeouts in 74.2 innings. He again played the 2018 season at both Double-A and Triple-A. He appeared in 43 games, making 6 starts, and accumulated a 3–3 record with a 2.39 ERA and 88 strikeouts across 74 innings. After the 2018 regular season, Bird pitched for the Yaquis de Obregón of the Mexican Pacific League in winter ball. In 18 games with them, he went 1–0 with a 2.00 ERA and 19 strikeouts in 18 innings.

The Rays added Bird to their 40-man roster after the 2018 season.

Texas Rangers
On December 21, 2018, Bird was traded to the Texas Rangers as part of a three team deal in which the Rangers also acquired Brock Burke, Yoel Espinal, Eli White, and $750,000 of international signing bonus pool space; the Rays acquired Emilio Pagan, Rollie Lacy, and a competitive balance pick in the 2019 MLB draft (Seth Johnson); and the Oakland Athletics acquired Jurickson Profar.

Bird made the Rangers' 2019 Opening Day roster on March 28, 2019, and made his major league debut that afternoon versus the Chicago Cubs, walking Anthony Rizzo, the only batter he faced. He split the season between the Rangers and the Nashville Sounds. With Texas he went 0–0 with a 7.82 ERA  innings, and with Nashville he went 5–1 with a 2.86 ERA in  innings. On January 15, 2020, Bird was designated for assignment by the Rangers and outrighted to Triple-A a few days later. Bird did not play in a game in 2020 due to the cancellation of the minor league season because of the COVID-19 pandemic. He became a free agent on November 2, 2020.

Hiroshima Toyo Carp
On November 26, 2020, it was announced that Bird had signed with the Hiroshima Toyo Carp of Nippon Professional Baseball. He made his NPB debut on June 14. In 33 appearances for Hiroshima, Bird pitched to a 4.57 ERA with 21 strikeouts in 21.2 innings pitched. He became a free agent after the season.

Seattle Mariners
On March 8, 2022, Bird signed a minor league contract with the Seattle Mariners. He elected free agency on November 10, 2022.

References

External links

Flagler Saints bio

 Career statistics - NPB.jp

1993 births
Living people
People from Orange Park, Florida
Baseball players from Florida
Major League Baseball pitchers
Texas Rangers players
Florida State Seminoles baseball players
Flagler Saints baseball players
Princeton Rays players
Bowling Green Hot Rods players
Charlotte Stone Crabs players
Montgomery Biscuits players
Durham Bulls players
Nashville Sounds players
Peoria Javelinas players
Yaquis de Obregón players
Tacoma Rainiers players
American expatriate baseball players in Mexico
Hiroshima Toyo Carp players